Edwin Thomas may refer to:
Edwin Thomas (novelist) (born 1977), English historical novelist
Edwin Stark Thomas (1872–1952), American judge
Edwin Thomas Maynard (1878–1961), known as Edwin Thomas, Wales international rugby player
Edwin Thomas (rugby league), rugby league footballer of the 1920s and 1930s
Edwin Thomas (actor) (born 1987), English actor
Edwin Lorimer Thomas, physicist
Edwin Ross Thomas (1850–1936), founder of Thomas Motor Company